The Ontario New Democratic Party Shadow Cabinet for the 41st Legislative Assembly of Ontario was announced on May 16, 2017.
 Andrea Horwath (Hamilton Centre) – Leader, Intergovernmental Affairs.
 Teresa Armstrong (London-Fanshawe) – Citizenship, Immigration and International Trade; and Seniors Affairs; Anti-Racism Directorate.
 Gilles Bisson (Timmins-James Bay) – Natural Resources and Forestry; Attorney General
 Sarah Campbell (Kenora-Rainy River) – Aboriginal Affairs; and Women’s Issues
 Joe Cimino (Sudbury) – Transportation.
 Cheri DiNovo (Parkdale-High Park) – Urban Transit; GTA Issues; and LGBTQ.
 Jennifer French (Oshawa) – Pensions.
 Catherine Fife (Kitchener Waterloo) – Finance; and Treasury Board.
 Cindy Forster (Welland) – Municipal Affairs and Housing; and Community and Social Services.
 Wayne Gates (Niagara Falls) – Economic Development and Employment; and Small Business; Government and Consumer Services.
 France Gelinas (Nickel Belt) – Francophone Affairs; and Health and Long-Term Care
 Lisa Gretzky (Windsor West) – Community Safety and Correctional Services
 Percy Hatfield (Windsor Tecumseh) – Infrastructure; and Environment and Climate Change
 Michael Mantha (Algoma-Manitoulin) – Northern Development and Mines.
 Paul Miller (Hamilton East-Stoney Creek) – Tourism, Culture and Sport; and 2015 Pan and Parapan American Games.
 Taras Natyshak (Essex) – Labour.
 Peggy Sattler (London-West) – Training, Colleges, and Universities; and Research and Innovation.
 Peter Tabuns (Toronto-Danforth) – Education; and Energy.
 Monique Taylor (Hamilton Mountain) – Children and Youth Services.
 John Vanthof (Timiskaming-Cochrane) – Agriculture, Food and Rural Affairs

References

See also
 Executive Council of Ontario
 Official Opposition Shadow Cabinet of the 41st Legislative Assembly of Ontario

Ontario New Democratic Party